World Tour Racing is a Formula One racing video game developed by Teque London and published by Telegames exclusively for the Atari Jaguar CD on June 2, 1997. It is the spiritual successor to F1 Licenceware's 1994 Amiga game F1-Racer and one of the last licensed titles for the add-on after being discontinued in 1996 by Atari Corporation, who merged with JT Storage in a reverse takeover prior to launch.

In the game, players compete against other racers across multiple tracks on various regions and countries around the world in order to finish on first place and advance to the next course. Conceived after the release of F1-Racer and originally announced in 1995, World Tour Racing went almost unreleased after Atari Corp. discontinued support for the Jaguar CD and merged with JTS until it was eventually picked up by Telegames.

World Tour Racing garnered mixed reception by video game magazines and dedicated outlets that reviewed it after being released very late on the platform. Critics praised the presentation, music and gameplay but was criticized for its low framerate and lack of Memory Track cartridge support for game save, while others were divided in regards to the controls.

Gameplay 

World Tour Racing is a three-dimensional Formula One-style racing game, similar to F1-Racer and Rebellion Developments' Checkered Flag on the Atari Jaguar, where the player must maneuver an F1 car to compete against artificially intelligent opponents or against another player on tracks set in various countries across the world, such as the United States and Britain. Prior to starting a race, players can adjust various settings on the options screen that can be accessed at the main menu such as the number of laps, automatic or manual transmission for the vehicle, control configuration, and difficulty level, among others, while progress is kept via a password, as the game does not have support for the Memory Track cartridge. During gameplay, players can choose between multiple camera views by pressing their respective number on the keypad. Players can also race as a bus via a cheat code.

Modes 
World Tour Racing offers between three different gameplay modes to choose from at the main menu screen, with some of them featuring support for two-player split screen matches and the ability to adjust their vehicle, in addition of other modes of play: Single Race, Championship and Arcade. Single Race, as the name implies, is a single race mode where players Single Race, Championship and Arcade. Single Race, as the name implies, is a single race mode where players pick any track and compete against CPU-controlled opponents or against another player. Championship is the main mode of the game, where the player must compete in a Grand Prix calendar against other opponents to qualify and advance into the next race. Arcade is similar to Championship mode, where players must race against other racers in a successive way to accumulate points.

Development and release 

Lee A. Briggs, who was previously involved on various titles for microcomputers such as Round the Bend! (based on the British children's television series of the same name), Sharkey's Moll and International Truck Racing, worked as the sole programmer on a formula one racing game for the Amiga titled F1-Racer, which was released by F1 Licenceware in 1994 and became his last project created for the platform before joining with Teque London around the same period to work on World Tour Racing for the Atari Jaguar CD.

In January 1997, Lee Briggs recounted about the development process of World Tour Racing in various posts at the Jaguar Interactive forum before the game's release. Lee stated that the development process took approximately 2 years and it was completed in January 1996, though he fixed various technical issues before the game was published and thanked Telegames for releasing it to the public. He also stated that twelve of the 16 tracks featured in the game were based on real-life F1 tracks, while four of them were fictional such as Egypt. He also claimed that Val d'Isère Skiing and Snowboarding composer Stephen "Steve" Morgan worked on the game's soundtrack.

Lee Briggs stated that the visuals of World Tour Racing are a combination of gouraud-shaded polygon models and environments with minimal texture-mapping, while featuring two-dimensional sprite-scaling and bitmap graphics for some of the environments to add detail, among other techniques with the system's hardware. Lee also stated that the game changes between different resolutions in real-time, as well as stating that the AI for the opponents was created on another platform before the project began development on the Jaguar.

World Tour Racing was first displayed to the public at Atari Corporation's booth during the Winter Consumer Electronics Show in 1995 under the name F1 Racer on the cartridge format, which showcased different visuals compared to the final release on CD-ROM. It was also showcased at Spring ECTS '95, and was originally planned to be published by Atari Corp. for a December 1995 release on the Jaguar CD. Despite internal documents from Atari listing the project as in development on December of the same year, the company would discontinue the Jaguar platform and merge with JT Storage in a reverse takeover in April 1996, leaving the game almost unreleased until Telegames became involved and released it worldwide on June 2, 1997. Being a late release after the discontinuation of the platform, the game could be purchased either through direct order from Telegames' US and UK websites and retailers or distributors such as Electronics Boutique in North America and Terre du Milieu in France respectively. After its release, the game was briefly mentioned in a special feature article dedicated to the system by German magazine Video Games. A PC version was planned but never released.

In 2004, a beta build of World Tour Racing was released by the defunct Jaguar Sector II website under a CD-ROM compilation titled Jaguar Extremist Pack #2, which featured the official F1 license before being removed in the final release. Another beta build of the game was also released by B&C Computervisions.

Reception 

The Atari Times gave a score of 69% with positives on graphics, and AI. The reviewer also liked the in-game music but noted that there are only three tunes. The reviewer, however, criticized the framerate. ST-Computer scored it 70%, praising the controls and two-player mode. They regard the game superior to other racing games of the system like Checkered Flag and Club Drive. They were also fairly positive on the graphics though considering them sub-par to those of PlayStation games.

References

External links 
 
 World Tour Racing at AtariAge
 World Tour Racing at GameFAQs
 World Tour Racing at MobyGames

1997 video games
Atari Jaguar CD games
Atari Jaguar-only games
Cancelled PC games
Formula One video games
Multiplayer and single-player video games
Racing video games
Telegames games
Teque London games
Video games developed in the United Kingdom
Video games set in Brazil
Video games set in Canada
Video games set in France
Video games set in Germany
Video games set in Hungary
Video games set in Italy
Video games set in Mexico
Video games set in Monaco
Video games set in Portugal
Video games set in the United Kingdom
Video games set in the United States